Exor may refer to:
 Exclusive or, the exclusive disjunction
 Exor, antagonist in Super Mario RPG
 ExOR (wireless network protocol), a protocol for a wireless Ad hoc networks
 Exor (company), an Italian investment holding company controlled by the Agnelli-Elkann family

See also
 XOR (disambiguation)